USS Silver Cloud is a name used more than once by the United States Navy, and may refer to:

 , a "tinclad" in commission from 1863 to 1865 that served in the American Civil War
 , a tanker in commission from 1944 to 1946

United States Navy ship names